The First Flotilla was a naval formation of the British Royal Navy commanded by the Flag Officer, First Flotilla from 1971 to 1990.

The Western Fleet and Far East Fleet were merged into the single Commander-in-Chief Fleet in 1971. Within this new structure three rear-admirals' appointments were created, the Flag Officer First Flotilla, Flag Officer Second Flotilla and Flag Officer, Carriers and Amphibious Ships. In 1990 the First, Second and Third Flotillas were unified to create a single formation called the Surface Flotilla.

Flag Officer First Flotilla

The Flag Officer, First Flotilla (FOF1)  was a senior Royal Navy post that existed from 1971 to 1990. 

Post holders included:

 Rear-Admiral John Ernle Pope: November 1969-July 1971
 Rear-Admiral Arthur M. Power: July 1971-January 1973 
 Vice-Admiral Iwan G. Raikes: January 1973-March 1974
 Vice-Admiral Henry C. Leach: March 1974-November 1975
 Vice-Admiral Anthony S. Morton: November 1975-March 1977
 Rear-Admiral Robert R. Squires: March 1977-October 1978
 Rear-Admiral David J. Hallifax: October 1978-April 1980
 Rear-Admiral D. Conrad Jenkin: April 1980-July 1981
 Rear-Admiral Sir John F. Woodward: July 1981-April 1983 
 Rear-Admiral J. Jeremy Black: April 1983-April 1984 
 Rear-Admiral Robin I. T. Hogg: April 1984-October 1986 
 Vice-Admiral John B. Kerr: October 1986-July 1988 
 Vice-Admiral John F. Coward: July 1988-September 1989 
 Vice-Admiral A. Peter Woodhead: September 1989 – 1990 

Note: the office is re-designated Flag Officer, Surface Flotilla.

Structure 

At various times included:

See also
 Royal Navy Surface Fleet

References

Footnotes

Sources 
 Mackie, Colin. (2018) "Royal Navy Senior Appointments from 1865" (PDF). gulabin.com. Colin Mackie. Scotland, UK.
 Roberts, John (2009). Safeguarding the Nation: The Story of the Modern Royal Navy. Barnsley, England: Seaforth Publishing. .
 Smith, Gordon. (2015) "Royal Navy Organisation and Ship Deployment 1947-2013:FLEET ORGANISATION, 1981-2002". www.naval-history.net. Gordon Smith.

 

F
Royal Navy flotillas
Military units and formations established in 1971
Military units and formations disestablished in 1990